Storbreahøe is a mountain in Lom Municipality in Innlandet county, Norway. The mountain is surrounded by several other notable mountains including Loftet and Skagsnebb to the north; Sauhøi to the east; Rundhøe to the southeast; Sokse, Veslebjørn, and Storebjørn to the south; Kniven and Store Smørstabbtinden to the southwest; Storbreatinden and Veslbreatinden to the west; and Veslfjelltinden to the northwest.

See also
List of mountains of Norway by height

References

Jotunheimen
Lom, Norway
Mountains of Innlandet